Urtlu (also Romanized as Ūrtlū; also known as Salmānābād, Qāsemābād, and Qāsem ‘Alī) is a village in Savalan Rural District, in the Central District of Parsabad County, Ardabil Province, Iran. At the 2006 census, its population was 233, in 36 families.

References 

Towns and villages in Parsabad County